Media Football League (MFL) is a Russian football tournament for media teams.

History 
Nikolay Osipov founded the MFL in 2022.

During the second season, Osipov announced that his own stadium with an orange lawn would be built. On October 2022, it became known that the Medialiga would have a second division. At the end of the same month, news also appeared that Medialiga could begin to be broadcast on the Match TV channel.

The first season of the league, which lasted from April to July 2022, was attended by 2DROTS, LFC Roma, Starmix, Na Sporte, Match TV, Basement, FC Art, SD Family, Reality and Broke Boys. In the end, which took place on July 10 at VTB Arena, in the presence of 11,000 spectators, 2DROTS beat Basement with a score of 4:0 and became the league champion and won a prize of 5 million rubles. After that, the acting president of the Russian Premier League, Alexander Alaev, said that the winner of the league could get the right to participate in the Russian Cup.

In the second season of the league, the teams were divided into 2 groups: Group A included Reality, LFC Roma, Amkal, Na Sporte, Bay Begi, Tamo Junto, Rodina Media, FC 10 and Broke Boys; in group "B" - FC Dengi, Watch TV (former "Match TV"), Goats, SD Family, MFK "Rubin" (media team as department of FC Rubin Kazan), 2DROTS, Egrisi, Fight Nights and Our guys. Dengi and Goats got to the league through voting among fans on the Sports.ru portal. In the form of sponsorship contracts with the league and teams, the second season was financed by betting companies in the amount of about 250 million rubles. The title sponsor was Winline.

The season started on September 16, 2022. After the 2nd round, the media reported on the departure of a number of team members from the clubs due to the partial mobilization announced as part of the preparations to the advanced stages of the Russian invasion of Ukraine. The final match between 2DROTS and Rodina Media was held on December 3 at the stadium of the FC Krasnodar Academy (the semi-finals were also held there on November 29 and 30). In regular time, the match ended in a draw 1:1, and a series of bullets (a mixture of penalties and shootouts) was won by 2DROTS with a score of 3:1. The team earned 7.5 million rubles for the victory.
After the completion of the second season, Nikolai Osipov announced that the third season is planned to be held from April to July 2023.

Finals

Reception 
Vladislav Zimagulov, correspondent of the Sport Express newspaper, called Media Football League a "risky project" that "became successful". Anton Zinkovsky from Komsomolskaya Pravda wrote that "Media Football League is the most discussed event in the Russian sports world".

References

External Links

Recurring sporting events established in 2022